Cameron Ward may refer to:

Cam Ward (born 1984), Canadian ice-hockey player
Cam Ward (politician) (born 1971), American politician in Alabama
Cameron Ward (American football) (born 2002), American gridiron football player